Geraldine Robert (born 26 June 1980) is a Gabonese-French female professional basketball player.

External links
Profile at eurobasket.com

1980 births
Living people
People from Port-Gentil
Gabonese women's basketball players
French women's basketball players
Gabonese emigrants to France
Small forwards
21st-century Gabonese people